Fimbristylis compacta is a sedge of the family Cyperaceae that is native to Australia.

The grass-like or herb sedge blooms between June and July and produces brown flowers.

In Western Australia it is found along creeks and in and around swamps in the Kimberley region where it grows in sandy soils.

References

Plants described in 1915
Flora of Western Australia
compacta
Taxa named by William Bertram Turrill